Ebonol is a synthetic material whose name derives from its similarity in appearance, hardness, and stability to ebony wood. Ebonol is used as a substitute for ebony in the construction of stringed and woodwind instruments (specifically clarinets). The material is particularly well suited for the fingerboards of fretless bass.

Ebonol is technically known as "XXX Paper Phenolic" and is a high-pressure laminate made from layers of black paper and phenolic resin.

See also 

 Richlite
 Micarta

Composite materials
Lutherie